The 2006 Wilkes-Barre/Scranton Pioneers season was the team's fifth season as a member of the af2. Following the resignation of head coach Les Moss after the 2005 season, the team hired area native Rich Ingold as the team's fifth coach in as many years. Ingold took the Pioneers to the playoffs for the third straight year; they lost in the first round to division rival Manchester Wolves.

Schedule

Regular season

Postseason

Final standings

Attendance

External links
 ArenaFan 2006 Wilkes-Barre/Pioneers schedule
 ArenaFan 2006 af2 standings
 ArenaFan 2006 af2 attendance

Wilkes-Barre/Scranton Pioneers seasons
Wilkes-Barre Scranton Pioneers
2006 in American football